The following lists events that happened during 1986 in Australia.

Incumbents

Monarch — Elizabeth II
Governor-General — Sir Ninian Stephen
Prime Minister — Bob Hawke
Deputy Prime Minister — Lionel Bowen
Opposition Leader — John Howard
Chief Justice — Sir Harry Gibbs

State and Territory Leaders
Premier of New South Wales — Neville Wran (until 4 July), then Barrie Unsworth
Opposition Leader — Nick Greiner
Premier of Queensland — Sir Joh Bjelke-Petersen
Opposition Leader — Nev Warburton
Premier of South Australia — John Bannon
Opposition Leader — John Olsen
Premier of Tasmania — Robin Gray
Opposition Leader — Ken Wriedt (until 19 February), then Neil Batt
Premier of Victoria — John Cain Jr.
Opposition Leader — Jeff Kennett
Premier of Western Australia — Brian Burke
Opposition Leader — Bill Hassell (until 25 November), then Barry MacKinnon
Chief Minister of the Northern Territory — Ian Tuxworth (until 10 May), then Stephen Hatton
Opposition Leader — Bob Collins (until 19 August), then Terry Smith
Chief Minister/President of the Legislative Assembly of Norfolk Island — David Buffett (until 21 May), then John Brown

Governors and Administrators
Governor of New South Wales — Sir James Rowland
Governor of Queensland — Sir Walter Campbell
Governor of South Australia — Sir Donald Dunstan
Governor of Tasmania — Sir James Plimsoll 
Governor of Victoria — Davis McCaughey (from 18 February)
Governor of Western Australia — Gordon Reid
Administrator of Norfolk Island — John Matthew
Administrator of the Northern Territory — Eric Johnston

Events

January
2 January — A state funeral is held for former Governor of Victoria Sir Henry Winneke at St Paul's Cathedral, Melbourne.
3 January — Federal Opposition Leader John Howard introduces a four-point plan to reduce interest rates.
4 January — A tanker driver is killed instantly when his truck overturns in Aspen, New South Wales, releasing clouds of nitrogen gas.
5 January — Actress Lauren Bacall arrives in Sydney to star in the play Sweet Bird of Youth.

February
2 February — Nurse Anita Cobby is abducted, robbed, raped and murdered by John Travers, Michael Murdoch, and Leslie, Gary and Michael Murphy at Prospect in Sydney (all five men are sentenced to life imprisonment without parole, June 1987).
7 February — Following Lindy Chamberlain's identification of a baby's jacket found near Uluru as being similar to the one worn by her baby Azaria, her case takes a new turn.  
8 February — 
Elections in Western Australia and Tasmania see the re-election of the ALP in WA, and the Liberal Party in Tasmania.
Post-mortem results support the claim of the sister of Sally Anne Huckstep that she was murdered.
Dire Straits makes history in Tasmania by drawing the state's biggest audience ever for an open-air concert.
9 February — Lindy Chamberlain is released from prison in Darwin on licence after serving 39 months of a life sentence.
11 February — 
Joan Child becomes the first female Speaker of the Australian House of Representatives.
More than 100 bushfires burn across the state of Victoria.
12 February — Ernie Bridge is elected to the West Australian Cabinet, thereby becoming the first Aborigine to become a Cabinet minister.

March
3 March — The Australia Act 1986 comes into effect at 1600 AEST, granting Australia legal independence from the United Kingdom by removing the power of the Parliament of the United Kingdom to legislate with effect in Australia and its states and territories.
18 March — Prime Minister Bob Hawke commits the Federal Government not to raise home interest lending rates above 13.5%, despite continued pressure from the banks.
27 March — The Russell Street bombing takes place at the headquarters of Victoria Police in Melbourne. A police constable, Angela Taylor, is killed.

April
2 April — Prime Minister Bob Hawke breaks an election promise by lifting the ceiling on home interest rates, following the banks' promise of an extra $6 million for home loans.
11 April — The Arbitration Commission finds that the Builders' Labourers Federation was guilty of serious industrial misconduct and the union is deregistered.
14 April — A second trial of Mr. Justice Lionel Murphy begins in Sydney, and lasts for two weeks, with the jury eventually acquitting him.

May
14 May — Responding to the release of dismal current account deficit figures, Federal Treasurer Paul Keating makes his infamous off-the-cuff warning about Australia becoming a "banana republic".

July
4 July — After ten years in power, Neville Wran resigns as Premier of New South Wales, and is replaced by Barrie Unsworth.
7 July — Barlow & Chambers are executed at Malaysia's Pudu Prison for drug trafficking. Prime Minister Hawke condemns the move as "barbaric".
16 July — An explosion at Moura No. 4 mine in Moura, Queensland kills 12 people.
25 July — An unusual cold dry change sweeps through south-eastern Australia, causing temperatures to plummet and bringing  of snow to Hobart, isolating the city until midday. Canberra also receives snow during the early afternoon with reports of snow and sleet also occurring in the suburbs of Melbourne and Sydney.

August
2 August — The painting The Weeping Woman by Pablo Picasso is stolen from the National Gallery of Victoria. The painting is found undamaged in a locker at Spencer Street station on 19 August.
6 August — A low pressure system moving from South Australia and redeveloping off the New South Wales coast dumps a record  of rain in a day on Sydney. Resulting floods kill six people.
9 August — Sydney schoolgirl Samantha Knight disappears in Bondi, Sydney.
19 August — The Federal Budget is handed down and outlines the Federal Government's aims to slash the deficit by increasing charges and making cuts to the Public Service. New Right thinking prompts the Opposition to foreshadow even more drastic changes.
21 August — Labor Caucus votes 74:42 to resume sales of uranium to France.

September
23 September — Federal Opposition Leader John Howard is suspended from the Australian House of Representatives for 24 hours after attacking Federal Treasurer Paul Keating for huge travel expenses incurred by claiming Sydney as his principal place of residence.

October
8 October — Following three years of wage indexation, the Australian Council of Trade Unions (ACTU) approves a two-tier wage-fixing system.
17 October — Brisbane loses bid to host 1992 Olympic Games to the Spanish city of Barcelona.
21 October — The Mr. Justice Lionel Murphy saga comes to a close when he dies of cancer.
24 October — The last link of the national microwave telephone system is completed at Kununurra in Western Australia.

November
1 November — The 1986 Queensland state election is held. Joh Bjelke-Petersen wins his final election as Premier of Queensland with his party, the National Party gaining 38.6% of the vote and an absolute majority of seats in the Queensland Parliament
27 November — Federal Treasurer Paul Keating is found liable to a fine of $4,000 for not lodging his tax return for 1985 and his 1986 return being overdue.

December
10 December — Senator George Georges resigns from the Australian Labor Party over uranium mining and the proposed ID card (Australia Card).
26 December — Tuning into rural disenchantment, Queensland Premier Sir Joh Bjelke-Petersen contemplates the notion of entering the federal political scene.

Arts and literature
 Elizabeth Jolley's novel The Well wins the Miles Franklin Award

Film
 30 April — Crocodile Dundee is released in Australia. The film will go on to become a worldwide smash hit, becoming the highest grossing Australian until 2015
 Malcolm
 The Fringe Dwellers

Law
Re Loubie a case involving the Queensland Bail Act and s.117 of the constitution.

Music
Before Too Long
Devils in Heaven rock band formed (as Dinner Time).
Don't Dream It's Over
Stimulation
You're the Voice

Television
5 January — SBS ceases VHF transmissions on Channel 0 in Sydney & Melbourne.
20 January — Neighbours makes its debut on Network Ten & comes to dominate the 7 pm weeknight timeslot.
February — Red Symons signs to Hey Hey It's Saturday as the show launches Red Faces.
30 October — The Movie Show begins on SBS.
December — The Herald and Weekly Times Ltd, owners of HSV-7 & ADS-7 are sold to Rupert Murdoch's News Limited for $1.8 billion. As News Limited owned ATV-10 at this time, HSV-7 is sold to Fairfax (already owners of ATN-7 & BTQ-7) in February 1987 for $320 million.
Christopher Skase's Qintex company sells TVQ-0 to Darling Downs Television, owners of DDQ-10 in Toowoomba.
AUSSAT satellites are launched, bringing television to remote areas for the first time.

Sport
16 March — Parramatta Stadium is opened. The Parramatta Eels defeat the St. George Dragons 36–6.
23 March — Robert de Castella is once again Australia's best finisher at the IAAF World Cross Country Championships, this time staged in Neuchâtel, Switzerland. He finishes in 14th place (36:10.9) in the long-distance race over 12,000 metres.
8 June — Stephen Austin wins the men's national marathon title, clocking 2:15:59 in Sydney, while Margaret Reddan claims the women's title in 2:48:28.
29 June — Last game of rugby league is played at the Sydney Sports Ground. Eastern Suburbs Roosters defeat the North Sydney Bears 21–14.
27 September — Hawthorn (16.14.110) defeats Carlton (9.14.68) in the 1986 VFL Grand Final to win the 90th VFL premiership.
28 September —
 Minor premiers Parramatta Eels defeat the Canterbury Bulldogs 4–2 in the lowest scoring grand final in history to win the 79th NSWRL premiership. It is the Eels' most recent premiership win. The Illawarra Steelers finish in last position, claiming their second straight wooden spoon.
 The Clive Churchill Medal, made to honour the late Clive Churchill (who died the previous year), is awarded to its inaugural recipient, Parramatta Eels halfback Peter Sterling.
4 November — At Talaq wins Melbourne Cup ridden by Michael Clarke.
Brownlow Medal awarded to Robert DiPierdomenico (Hawthorn) and Greg Williams (Sydney)
 Farrier Command 10  "Aussie" was constructed and launched.

Births

January

 7 January – Shane Alexander, volleyball player
 8 January – Scott Anderson, rugby player
 9 January – Paul Benz, Paralympic athlete
 10 January – Des Abbott, field hockey player
 14 January – Sam Butler, footballer
 20 January – Kevin Parker, singer/songwriter and guitarist
 21 January – Kirin J. Callinan, singer/songwriter and guitarist
 23 January – Joseph Brennan, author
 28 January – Nathan Outteridge, sailor

February

 3 February – Selasi Berdie, rugby player
 4 February – Jackie Barnes, drummer for Rose Tattoo
 8 February – Scott Arnold, squash player
 9 February – Marieke D'Cruz, swimmer
 12 February – Johanna Allston, orienteer
 14 February
 Daniel Conn, model and rugby player
 Cameron Crombie, Paralympic shot putter and javelin thrower
 20 February – Shannon Ashlyn, actress
 22 February
 David Barnes, Olympic archer
 Josh Helman, actor
 Joel Brunker, boxer
 23 February
 Troy Chaplin, footballer
 Kate Keltie, actress
 26 February
 Lichelle Clarke, Paralympic swimmer
 Teresa Palmer, actress, writer, model and film producer
 27 February – Jayden Attard, footballer
 28 February – Tendai Mzungu, footballer

March

 1 March – Kathryn Beck, actress
 3 March – Catherine Cannuli, soccer player and coach
 7 March – Shannon Cox, footballer
 8 March – Michelle Steele, athlete
 13 March – Gillian Alexy, actress
 14 March – Trent Copeland, cricketer
 15 March – Jai Courtney, actor
 17 March – Chelsea Baker, rugby player
 18 March – Arlo Bugeja, speedway rider
 19 March – Daniel Dillon, basketball player
 20 March
 Ruby Rose, actress, model, and television presenter
 Dean Geyer, actor, singer and Australian Idol contestant
 22 March – Andrew Barisic, footballer
 26 March – Jessica Hart, model
 27 March – Joshua Allison, wheelchair basketball player
 28 March – Richard Cardozo, footballer

April

 1 April – James Albury, baseball player
 3 April – Burt Cockley, cricketer
 4 April
 Steven Brown, judoka personnel
 Bevan Calvert, handball player
 Erin Carroll, badminton player
 11 April – Hayley Aitken, pop singer/songwriter
 16 April
 Miles Armstrong, tennis player
 Bronwen Knox, water polo player
 24 April – Tahyna Tozzi, model, singer and actress
 29 April – Danny Clayton, television and radio presenter

May

 1 May – Adam Casey footballer
 4 May – Zoë Badwi, singer/songwriter, model, and actress
 7 May – Mark Furze, actor and singer
 9 May – Kirby Bentley, footballer
 16 May – Paul Carroll, volleyball player
 23 May – Marcus Allan, footballer
 28 May
 Berrick Barnes, rugby union player
 Chris Bond, wheelchair rugby player

June

 2 June
 Todd Carney, rugby player
 Pekahou Cowan, rugby player
 5 June – Ahren Stringer, musician, bassist and singer for The Amity Affliction
 6 June – Nathan van Berlo, footballer
 12 June
 Benjamin Schmideg, actor
 Harry Taylor, footballer
 15 June – Ronnie Buckley, discus thrower
 29 June – Christopher Egan, actor

July

 4 July – Leah Blayney, footballer and coach
 8 July – Timothy Cox, baseball player
 11 July – Bryn Coudraye, Olympic rower
 12 July
 360, rapper
 Krystal Forscutt, reality TV star
 14 July – Nic Beveridge, Paralympic triathlete
 16 July – Leith Brodie, swimmer
 18 July
 Simon Clarke, Olympic cyclist
 James Sorensen, actor
 24 July
 Natalie Tran, comedian
 Remy Hii, Malaysian-born actor
 25 July – Travis Baird, footballer
 28 July – Karyn Bailey, netball player

August

 3 August – Ryan Brabazon, footballer
 8 August – Alex Cudlin, motorcycle racer
 10 August – Mia-Rae Clifford, footballer
 11 August – Dean Timmins, English-born figure skater
 12 August – Chris Adams, rugby player
 14 August – Nigel Boogaard, footballer
 16 August – Felicity Abram, triathlete
 18 August – Anthony Alozie, Nigerian-born track and field sprinter
 19 August – Adam Cockshell, footballer
 22 August – Shane Cross, skateboarder (d. 2007)
 28 August
 Briggs, rapper, record label owner, comedy writer, actor, and author
 Sarah Christophers, actress
 30 August – Ali Abbas, Iraqi-born footballer
 31 August
 Chloe Boreham, actress
 Melanie Schlanger, freestyle swimmer

September

 4 September – Liam Adams, Olympic runner
 8 September – Brett Anderson, rugby player
 10 September
 Laura Attard, footballer
 Cheyenne Campbell, rugby player
 18 September – Eloise Mignon, actress
 19 September – Sally Pearson, Olympic hurdler
 22 September – Ebanie Bridges, boxer
 29 September – Greg Broughton, footballer

October

 1 October 
 Prashanth Sellathurai, gymnast
 Justin Westhoff, footballer
 4 October – James Brooke, DJ and radio host
 10 October
 Julie Corletto, netball player
 Nathan Jawai, basketball player
 13 October – Sarah Calati, Paralympic wheelchair tennis player
 14 October – Nicholas Colla, actor, writer, and director
 15 October – Tony Caine, rugby player
 16 October – Peter George, cricketer
 18 October – Renee Bargh, entertainment reporter
 20 October
 Adam D'Apuzzo, footballer
 Elyse Taylor, model
 21 October – Candice Dianna, singer/songwriter, voice actress, and record producer
 23 October – Max Bailey, footballer and coach
 30 October – Adam Gibson, basketball player
 31 October
 Chris Alajajian, Australian-born Armenian race car driver
 Christie Hayes, actress

November

 1 November – Kristina Akheeva, Russian-born actress and model
 2 November – Lara Sacher, actress
 5 November – Nathan Crawford, baseball player
 9 November – Luke Blackwell, footballer
 10 November – James Aspey, animal rights activist and lecturer
 19 November
 Renae Camino, basketball player
 Brad Hill, basketball player
 Jessicah Schipper, swimmer
 26 November
 Eddie Betts, footballer
 Tom Cooper, Australian-born Dutch cricketer

December

 8 December – Lara Carroll, English-born Olympic swimmer
 9 December
 Aron Baynes, basketball player
 Johannah Curran, netball player
 10 December – Joshua Adams, dancesport competitor
 11 December – Jackson Bird, cricketer
 14 December – James Aubusson, rugby player
 19 December
 Luke Cook, actor, director, writer, and content creator
 Gemma Pranita, actress
 21 December – Davey Browne, boxer (d. 2015)
 22 December
 Dennis Armfield, footballer
 Arianne Caoili, Filipino-born chess player (d. 2020) 
 23 December – Beau Champion, rugby player
 27 December – Torah Bright, snowboarder
 29 December – Chris Cayzer, singer and actor
 30 December – Tara Cheyne, politician

Full Date Unknown
 Abdul Abdullah, artist
 Zane Banks, guitarist
 Ali Barter, pop rock singer/songwriter
 Graeme Begbie, field hockey player
 Alexander Campbell, ballet dancer
 Joel Carroll, field hockey player
 Melanie Cheng, doctor and author
 Nadia Clancy, politician
 Jesse Cox, radio producer, broadcaster, and documentary maker (d. 2017)
 Michael Czugaj, glazier and convicted drug trafficker

Deaths
 21 October — Lionel Murphy (born 1922), former Attorney-General of Australia and High Court judge
 7 November — Tracy Pew (born 1957), bass guitarist for The Birthday Party
 12 December – Buddy Williams (born 1918), country musician

See also
 1986 in Australian television
 List of Australian films of 1986

References

 
Australia
Years of the 20th century in Australia